Rubinstein Bagels is a bagel shop with two locations in Seattle, in the U.S. state of Washington.

Description 
When the original shop opened, Rubinstein offered 12 bagel varieties, including jalapeño white cheddar, salted rosemary, and shallot. Various schmears are also available, and the menu has also included egg breakfast sandwiches, salads, and duck fat matzo ball soup.

History 
The business operates in South Lake Union and on Capitol Hill since 2021. There are plans to expand to Redmond, in 2023. Andrew Rubinstein is the owner.

Reception 
Alana Al-Hatlani included Rubinstein in Eater Seattle's 2022 list of "10 Sensational Bagel Shops Around the Seattle Area".

References

External links

 
 

Bagel companies
Capitol Hill, Seattle
Restaurants in Seattle
South Lake Union, Seattle